L'Unité africaine was the main organ of the Senegalese Progressive Union. It was published monthly between 1958 and 1984. In 1984 it was replaced by L'Unité pour le socialisme.

References

Defunct magazines published in Senegal
Defunct political magazines
French-language magazines
French West Africa
Magazines established in 1958
Magazines disestablished in 1984
Monthly magazines
Magazines published in Senegal
Socialist magazines